Padmashree Laloo Prasad Yadav is a Bollywood comedy film directed by Mahesh Manjrekar. starring Sunil Shetty , Mahesh Manjrekar    Johnny Lever, Sharat Saxena and Gulshan Grover in supporting roles. The title, which comprises the names of the four lead characters, is meant to be a pun on Lalu Prasad Yadav, an Indian politician. It is an unofficial remake of the 1988 Hollywood movie A Fish Called Wanda.

Synopsis 
Laloo (Sunil Shetty)'s girlfriend Padma (Masumeh Makhija) is fed up of his regular cheating on her. After one such incident she takes a flight to Cape Town to recover some jewels, which are rightfully hers, since her father's partner wrongfully stole them. Padma lands in Cape Town to discover him already there to receive her. After endless bouts of asking for her forgiveness Laloo is finally pardoned for the nth time.
Laloo tries to help out Padma in her mission but ends up messing things up miserably. To get out of the mess Laloo obtains help from a local thug in Cape Town named Johnny, a club owner, and from his sidekick Yadav (Johnny Lever), who help them rob the bank holding the jewels. The four rob the bank, recover the stolen jewels, and split up outside the bank. While escaping from the bank, Yadav nearly runs over an old lady (Shashikala) with three dogs who becomes a witness to the robbery.

Now that the jewels are out from the bank, Padma has no qualms about ditching the other three. A game of double crossing begins. Padma calls the police and informs them of Johnny having robbed the bank, after which the police arrest but Johnny has already moved the jewels.

Padma turns her charms to Prasad (Mahesh Manjrekar), the lawyer who is fighting for Johnny. She entices Prasad to extract the information as to where the jewels have been hidden by Johnny. Laloo gets jealous of Prasad and wants to teach him a lesson, but has not reckoned on Yadav, who has also fallen victim to Padma's charms.

Cast 
 Sunil Shetty as Lalchand Dilachand (Laloo)
 Masumi Makhija as Padmashree Divakar Kashyap
 Mahesh Manjrekar as Advocate Prasad Pritam Pradyuma
 Johnny Lever as Yadav
 Gulshan Grover as Johnny
 Sharat Saxena as Uncle Tom (Laloo's uncle)
 Kim Sharma as Rita
 Anupama Verma as Mrs. Pradyuma
 Navdeep Singh as Seth 
 Kalpana Pandit
 Lalu Prasad Yadav as himself (special appearance)
 Vikash Verma as Don
 Puneeth Rajkumar

Music 
Music was done by 3 music directors, Anand Raj Anand, Sukhwinder Singh and Nitin Rai

 "Aaoonga Nahn Peeche Peeche" - Abhijeet, Vaishali Samant - Music: Anand Raj Anand
 "Chidiya Chidiya" - Vaishali Samant, Mahesh Manjrekar - Music: Anand Raj Anand
 "Chidiya Chidiya" (Fadooo Mix) - Mahesh Manjrekar, Vaishali Samant - Music: Anand Raj Anand
 "Deewana" - Music and Singer: Sukhwinder Singh
 "Jadoo" (Female) - Sunidhi Chauhan - Music: Sukhwinder Singh
 "Jadoo" (Male) - Music and Singer: Sukhwinder Singh
 "Kabhi To Rooth Ja" - Shaan - Music: Nitin Raikar
 "Padmashree Laloo Prasad Yadav" Vinod Rathod, K. K. - Music: Nitin Raikwar

Reception
The film was screened at the 2005 Global Indian Film Awards held in Dubai. Rediff.com's film critic called the picture "an insult to cinema".

References

External links 
 

2000s Hindi-language films
2005 films
Films scored by Anand Raj Anand
Indian remakes of American films
Films scored by Sukhwinder Singh
Films scored by Nitin Raikwar
Films scored by Ajay–Atul
Films directed by Mahesh Manjrekar